Arthur Thomson (July 1903 – unknown) was an English footballer who played as a forward. Born in West Stanley, County Durham, he played for West Stanley, Craghead United, Morecambe, Southend United and Manchester United.

External links
Profile at MUFCInfo.com

1903 births
Year of death missing
English footballers
Manchester United F.C. players
Morecambe F.C. players
Southend United F.C. players
West Stanley F.C. players
People from South Moor
Footballers from County Durham
Craghead United F.C. players
Association football forwards